Leigh Hennessy also known as Leigh Hennessy Robson, is a stunt woman, author, and trampoline gymnast. She was a two-time double mini-trampoline world champion, (1976, 1978) and won a silver medal in synchronized trampoline at the World Trampoline Championships, (1976). In the late 1990s, she translated her athletic career into one as an actress and stunt performer for film and television.

Early life and education 
Leigh Hennessy was born in Lafayette, Louisiana. Her father, Jeff Hennessy, was an expert in the sport of trampolining. She started jumping on trampolines at age 3, and her father serving as her first coach.

Hennessy attended Lafayette High School and the University of Louisiana at Lafayette (UL Lafayette), and trained under her father. She earned her master's degree in Communication from UL Lafayette.

In 2008, Hennessy and Mark B. Robson married at the Birse Kirk church in Birse, located in the Scottish Highlands.

Trampoline 
In 1978, she was the first athlete, male or female, to win all three trampoline events in the US National Championships. She was honored in 1978 by the Southern Amateur Athletic Union as "Athlete of the Year.

While attended UL Lafayette, Hennessy was a five-time National Amateur Athletic Union (AAU) All-American for trampoline, from 1976 to 1980. After graduation, Hennessy became a 10-time United States champion and two-time World Champion.

According to Guinness World Records, she holds the record for winning the most US national championships in trampoline for women. She competed for the United States in numerous world championships in individual trampoline, synchronized trampoline, and double mini-trampoline, winning two Senior level world titles. In August 2007, Hennessy was inducted into the USA Gymnastics Hall of Fame in recognition of her trampoline achievements.

Film career 
Leigh's career shifted to stunt work in Hollywood. Among her list of credits includes performing stunts for Demi Moore as her stunt double in GI Jane (1997), performing 90-foot high-falls for Lucy Liu in both Charlie's Angels movies (2000, 2003) and, she shared the opening scenes of The Guardian (2006) with Kevin Costner, in which she played the role of the drowning wife.

She was nominated for a Taurus World Stunt Award in 2006, 2007 for her work.

Publications

Honors
World Acrobatics Society Legends Hall of Fame, 2005
Lifetime achievement award from the International Trampoline Federation, 1982
University of Louisiana Ragin Cajun Athletics Hall of Fame, 2019

References

External links
Official site

USA Gymnastics Hall of Fame
Louisiana Ragin Cajun Athletic Network

University of Louisiana at Lafayette alumni
People from Lafayette, Louisiana
American female trampolinists
Actresses from Louisiana
University of Louisiana at Lafayette people
Year of birth missing (living people)
Living people
21st-century American women